The Diving competition in the 1991 Summer Universiade was held in Sheffield, England.

Medal overview

Medal table

References
 

1991 Summer Universiade
1991
1991 in diving